Serby is a village in the administrative district of Gmina Głogów, within Głogów County, Lower Silesian Voivodeship, in south-western Poland.

The village has an approximate population of 1,200.

See also
Stare Serby

References

Serby